Bloom Township is one of the fifteen townships of Seneca County, Ohio, United States.  The 2010 census found 1,799 people in the township, 843 of whom lived in the unincorporated portions of the township.

Geography
Located in the southeastern part of the county, it borders the following townships:
Scipio Township - north
Reed Township - northeast corner
Venice Township - east
Chatfield Township, Crawford County - southeast
Lykens Township, Crawford County - south
Texas Township, Crawford County - southwest corner
Eden Township - west
Clinton Township - northwest corner

The village of Bloomville is located in central Bloom Township.

Name and history
Bloom Township was organized in 1824. It was named from its scenic rustic setting.

Statewide, other Bloom Townships are located in Fairfield, Morgan, Scioto, and Wood counties.

Government
The township is governed by a three-member board of trustees, who are elected in November of odd-numbered years to a four-year term beginning on the following January 1. Two are elected in the year after the presidential election and one is elected in the year before it. There is also an elected township fiscal officer, who serves a four-year term beginning on April 1 of the year after the election, which is held in November of the year before the presidential election. Vacancies in the fiscal officership or on the board of trustees are filled by the remaining trustees.

References

External links
County website

Townships in Seneca County, Ohio
Townships in Ohio